The 1969 V FIBA International Christmas Tournament "Trofeo Raimundo Saporta" was the 5th edition of the FIBA International Christmas Tournament. It took place at Sports City of Real Madrid Pavilion, Madrid, Spain, on 24, 25 and 26 December 1969 with the participations of Real Madrid (champions of the 1968–69 Liga Española de Baloncesto) and also runners-up of the 1968–69 FIBA European Champions Cup), Panama, Buenos Aires Selection and Juventud Nerva (champions of the 1968–69 Copa del Rey de Baloncesto and also runners-up of the 1968–69 Liga Española de Baloncesto).

League stage

Day 1, December 24, 1969

|}

Day 2, December 25, 1969

|}

Day 3, December 26, 1969

|}

Final standings

References

1969–70 in European basketball
1969–70 in Spanish basketball